Zheng Tian Hui (born 24 January 1986) is a retired professional wushu taolu athlete from Hong Kong. She is a ten-time medalist at the World Wushu Championships and a three-time world champion. She also won a silver medal at the 2010 Asian Games.

See also 
 List of Asian Games medalists in wushu

References 

Living people
Hong Kong wushu practitioners
Wushu practitioners at the 2010 Asian Games
Asian Games silver medalists for Hong Kong
Asian Games medalists in wushu
Medalists at the 2010 Asian Games
1986 births